BoyleSports is an Irish gambling company founded in 1982. Its product offering includes sports betting, online casino, online poker, and online bingo. Headquartered in Dundalk, the business is split into two divisions, online and retail. Retail operations are conducted from its Dundalk base, while its online business operates from its satellite office in Gibraltar. As of 2023, BoyleSports has over 320 retail branches throughout Ireland and the UK.

History

BoyleSports was established by John Boyle in 1982 when he opened his first betting shop in Markethill, Co. Armagh, Northern Ireland. In 1989, five outlets were opened in Drogheda, and in 2002, a further 14 new shops were opened.

The organisation had 77 shops by August 2004, and opened their 100th store two years later in 2006.

In February 2011, BoyleSports took over 17 new shops from Celtic Bookmakers, saving 100 jobs. Later that year BoyleSports saved 65 more jobs with a strategic takeover of 15 William Hill shops.

In July 2017, Conor Gray succeeded founder John Boyle as BoyleSports CEO who assumed the role of Executive Chairman.

In September 2018, BoyleSports celebrated the opening of their 250th shop in Kilcullen, Co. Kildare and announced plans to further expand its retail and online business.

In June 2019, BoyleSports announced they had entered the UK retail market with the acquisition of independent bookmaker Wilf Gilbert, who ran 13 betting shops in the Midlands, for an undisclosed sum.

In January 2020, BoyleSports expanded its operation in Northern Ireland by acquiring 33 William Hill shops making the company Ireland's biggest retail bookmaker.

In 2021, Mark Kemp, managing director of the UK Tote Group was announced as the new CEO of BoyleSports following a company restructure. Former CEO Conor Gray's role was changed to commercial director.

In November 2021, BoyleSports announced an acquisition deal with independent bookmakers, Tully. The deal includes the acquisition of Tully’s telephone betting business in addition to acquiring ten retail venues. This deal aided in maintaining BoyleSports positions as the largest independent betting operator in Ireland with 268 retail betting shops throughout Ireland.

In February 2022, it was announced that Kemp would be leaving the company at the end of July 2022. John Boyle and Conor Gray are due to pickup up executive roles following his departure.

Sponsorship

Horse Racing
Since 2010, BoyleSports Champion Chase Day has run at the Punchestown Festival each year. Prize money for the feature race, the Grade 1 BoyleSports Champion Chase, increased from €140,000 to  €300,000 between 2010 and 2019. Previous winners include Big Zeb, Sizing Europe, Sprinter Sacre and Un De Sceaux.

In 2014, BoyleSports became the headline sponsor of the most prestigious race in the Irish National Hunt calendar, the Irish Grand National, which runs at Fairyhouse Racecourse each Easter Monday. In August 2016 it was announced that the prize money would be increased to €500,000, making it the richest National Hunt race in Ireland. The increase in prize money lead to a top-class level of entry with top trainers Willie Mullins and Gordon Elliott identifying it as a vital step to winnings the Trainers' Championship.

In January 2020, BoyleSports announced that they had pledged €2,000,000 in prize money to extend their sponsorship of the BoyleSports Irish Grand National for a further four years, maintaining its title as the riches race in the National Hunt calendar.

In October 2014, BoyleSports and Irish national broadcaster RTE announced that BoyleSports would become the sponsor of the RTE Racing programmes across TV, radio and online in a deal worth €1,000,000. In 2017 an extension of their partnership was announced.

Football
In June 2019, BoyleSports announced they had signed a two-season deal to become the main sponsor of EFL Championship side Birmingham City. The club stated that this was their biggest sponsorship deal in over a decade. The announcement was made at the official unveiling of the club's home kit at the Birmingham Back to Backs tourist attraction in Birmingham City Centre in a Peaky Blinders-styled launch event. In April 2021, BoyleSports announced they had extended their sponsorship deal for two more seasons with Birmingham City until 2023.

In 2020, BoyleSports became English Premier League side Wolverhampton Wanderers Molineux betting partner for the 2020/21 season. BoyleSports extended their partnership with Wolves for the 2021/22 season.

In August 2020, BoyleSports became the main sponsor of Coventry City. In 2021, Coventry City announced they had agreed to a two year extension with BoyleSports. The deal was described as bringing "vital revenue" to the club until the end of the 2022/23 season.

In August 2021, BoyleSports was announced as UK and Ireland Betting Partner of English Premier League side Newcastle United.

Darts
In July 2019, BoyleSports announced they had agreed a deal with the Professional Darts Corporation to sponsor the BoyleSports World Grand Prix in the Citywest Convention Centre, running from 2019 to 2021. Speaking at the launch, Michael van Gerwen stated his love for the Irish fans saying, "This tournament has something special. The people love it and they come out to support". The tournament is broadcast live on Sky Sports for seven nights each year. In 2020, BoyleSports were announced as the title sponsor of the 2020 Grand Slam of Darts, extending their sponsorship of PDC tournaments.

Greyhounds
BoyleSports became the headline sponsor in 2014 for the Irish Greyhound Derby held in Shelbourne Park every September. In 2017, an announcement was made detailing the increase in prize money from €240,000 to €300,000 for the 2018 Derby. In 2021, BoyleSports announced a new three year extension of their sponsorship of the Irish Greyhound Derby. The value of this sponsorship is expected to exceed €3m.

Other
Previous major sponsorship deals have included title sponsor of Sunderland AFC (2007 - 2010) in the Premier League, the BoyleSports Hurdle during the Leopardstown Festival, the BoyleSports Irish Guineas Festival at the Curragh, the BoyleSports Champion stakes at Shelbourne Park and the BoyleSports International at Dundalk Stadium.

In April 2022, Boyle sports announced its deal with online audio and Video betting media company Spotlight Sports Group (SSG), to become official title sponsor of SSG’s golf show.

Brand ambassadors
Former Republic of Ireland international footballer, Kevin Kilbane, joined BoyleSports as Football Brand Ambassador in 2016. The Match Of The Day and Virgin Media Sport pundit offers insight into upcoming football events for BoyleSports customers in shops and online.

Also in 2016, Cheltenham Gold Cup, Aintree Grand National and BoyleSports Irish Grand National winning jockey, Robbie "Puppy" Power joined BoyleSports as Horse Racing Ambassador.

Previous brand ambassadors have included Stan Collymore, Joseph O'Brien and Gordon Elliott.

In 2021, former England and Liverpool captain Steven Gerrard and sports broadcaster Natalie Sawyer joined BoyleSports as brand ambassadors ahead of the 2020 UEFA European Championship.

Controversies
 
In June 2012 it was reported that employees of BoyleSports were made to attend compulsory training-courses held by Georgina Dolan, an associate of Tony Quinn. The courses promoted the Educo Model which upset many employees forced to attend these courses. A circular sent to staff said "When people's minds are occupied by fear, anger, jealousy, blame, conspiracy, suspicion and other negative emotions, their clarity of thought and mental and physical agility is degraded, leading to lower quality of work". John Boyle, who had attended an Educo Seminar, said "I believe totally in myself and my business. I am not part of anything other than being John Boyle, the best that John Boyle can be. What I want to do is train people to be the best they can". 

In January 2013 Boylesports retained the services of Tom McCarthy, formerly Chief Executive of the Irish Management Institute, to review all corporate training. Boylesports immediately issued a statement including "Mindfulness training served a particular purpose for the company at a particular time and it is not something that will be offered in future."

In May 2013 Dialogue Ireland claimed an article about the controversy was their most viewed article with over 24,500 views.

References

Further reading
BoyleSports appoints Conor Gray as new chief executive
BoyleSports opens its 250th shop 
BoyleSports Left Spinning After £4 Lands £1.4 Million Jackpot

Bookmakers
Gambling companies of Ireland
Sunderland A.F.C.
Companies established in 1989
Irish companies established in 1989
Online gambling companies of Ireland